Michael Greyeyes (born June 4, 1967) (Muskeg Lake Cree Nation) is an Indigenous Canadian actor, dancer, choreographer, director, and educator.

In 1996, Greyeyes portrayed Crazy Horse in the television film Crazy Horse. In 2018, Greyeyes portrayed Sitting Bull in Woman Walks Ahead to critical acclaim. He has also had TV roles on Fear the Walking Dead, True Detective and I Know This Much Is True. In 2021–2022, he had a main role in the sitcom Rutherford Falls. He won the Canadian Screen Award for Best Actor at the 9th Canadian Screen Awards in 2021, for his performance in the zombie film Blood Quantum.

Life and career
Born in Saskatchewan, Greyeyes is Plains Cree from the Muskeg Lake First Nation. His father was from the Muskeg Lake First Nation and his mother was from the Sweetgrass First Nation, both located in Saskatchewan.  Greyeyes started his performance career as a dancer. He is a graduate of The National Ballet School in 1984. He became an apprentice with The National Ballet of Canada before joining the company as a Corps de Ballet member in 1987.

After three years, he moved to New York City in 1990 to join the company of modern dance choreographer Eliot Feld. Greyeyes performed in many of Feld's seminal works, including Intermezzo, Skara Brae, and The Jig is Up. He performed in roles created for him in such ballets as Common Ground and Bloom's Wake. After years of also working as an actor, Greyeyes later completed his master's degree in Fine Arts at the School of Theatre and Dance at Kent State University and graduated in May 2003.

Greyeyes began his acting career in 1993, when he was cast as Juh in TNT's Geronimo. This role led to numerous television appearances, including guest-starring performances in Law & Order: Criminal Intent, Walker, Texas Ranger, Numb3rs, Dr. Quinn, Medicine Woman, and Millennium. In 1998 he starred in Stolen Women, Captured Hearts, with Janine Turner and Patrick Bergen. He is featured in the mini-series Klondike, Dreamkeeper, Rough Riders, Big Bear, and True Women.

His films include: Dance Me Outside, Smoke Signals, Sunshine State, Skipped Parts, Skinwalkers (based on the book by Tony Hillerman), and Woman Walks Ahead (2017), in which he played Chief Sitting Bull opposite Jessica Chastain as a portrait painter.

Greyeyes also continued his dance research on the modern form of traditional dancing, Powwow. His journey of exploration was documented in He Who Dreams: Michael on the Powwow Trail for CBC Television by Adrienne Clarkson.  He choreographed and performed in Rebecca Belmore's durational performance art work Gone Indian for Toronto's Nuit Blanche.

Greyeyes continues to act and dance regularly. His more recent works include The New World directed by Terrence Malick, Tecumseh's Vision, a PBS documentary/live action drama, and Passchendaele, which opened the 2008 Toronto International Film Festival.  Triptych (a short film broadcast nationally on Bravo! Television), andUntitled #1535 is a site-specific dance work he choreographed for Dusk Dances. The Journey (Pimooteewin) is an opera he directed with music by Melissa Hui and libretto by Tomson Highway.

He did the voice of Tommy in the action game Prey. He played a recurring role on Fear The Walking Dead (2017).

In 2010, Greyeyes founded Signal Theatre, a company that explores intercultural and transdisciplinary live performance. As Artistic Director and choreographer, he has overseen the creation of three major works, including From thine eyes (Harbourfront Centre), Nôhkom (The Banff Centre), and A Soldier's Tale (Fleck Dance Theatre), a work examining the aftermath of war upon soldiers and their families. He has said that he "was not interested in staging ethnicity." A Soldier's Tale was co-produced by The National Arts Centre and The Canada Dance Festival and opened the 2014 Canada Dance Festival in Ottawa at the NAC Theatre. Signal Theater has also produced installations and performance art works, such as Winter Home, which premiered in Saskatoon, Saskatchewan.

Greyeyes won the Canadian Screen Award for Best Actor at the 9th Canadian Screen Awards in 2021, for his performance in the zombie film Blood Quantum. He has played the main role of Terry Thomas, CEO of a fictional tribe's casino on the Peacock TV series Rutherford Falls (2021-2022).

In 2021 Greyeyes was signed to a first look deal with Blumhouse Productions. Greyeyes appears as John Rainbird in the 2022 film Firestarter, based on the Stephen King novel of the same name.

In 2023 he is slated to participate as one of the panelists in Canada Reads, championing Emily St. John Mandel's novel Station Eleven''.

Personal life
Greyeyes is an associate professor of theatre at York University. He is married to Nancy Latoszewski. They have two daughters, Lilia and Eva, born in 2002 and 2004.

Filmography

Film

Television

Video games

Awards and nominations

References

External links
 
 
 
 

1967 births
First Nations male actors
Canadian male film actors
Canadian male television actors
Canadian male voice actors
Cree people
Kent State University alumni
Living people
Male actors from Saskatchewan
Best Actor Genie and Canadian Screen Award winners